Dadra and Nagar Haveli were both liberated in 1954 by Indian nationalists but the union territory of Dadra and Nagar Haveli was not declared till 1961. Technically speaking, it is only after that, that Dadra and Nagar Haveli became part of India. Usually, the administrator of Dadra and Nagar Haveli also acted as the administrator of Daman and Diu. The union territory of Dadra and Nagar Haveli was merged with the nearby territory of Daman and Diu to create the new union territory of Dadra and Nagar Haveli and Daman and Diu on 26 January 2020 and the office of Administrator of Dadra and Nagar Haveli was abolished on that date.

Prime Minister (De Facto) 
After Dadra and Nagar Haveli liberated Gujarat cadre IAS officer K. G. Badlani was appointed Prime Minister of the territory on August 11, 1961. He became Prime Minister for one day.

He ceded the territory to India. As a Prime Minister, he had signed an agreement with then Prime Minister of India Jawaharlal Nehru.

Administrator

See also
 Governors of India
 List of administrators of Dadra and Nagar Haveli and Daman and Diu
 List of administrators of Daman and Diu

References

 India states, worldstatesmen.org
 Ramjayam Nadar, Office Seceratary, UT PRESS CLUB, Silvassa

Indian government officials
 
DNH